The Fairs Act 1204 is an Irish statute enacted in 1204, the 6th year of the reign of John, King of England.  It provided for the erection of a castle and fortifications at Dublin and the establishment of fairs at Donnybrook, Waterford and Limerick.  It is currently the oldest statute in force on the Irish statute book by virtue of the Statute Law Revision Act 2007.

References
Legislation Directory. Irish Statute Book.

1204 in Ireland
1204
13th-century establishments in Ireland
1204 establishments